WDFX may refer to:

 WDFX-TV, a television station (channel 34 analog/33 digital) licensed to Dothan, Alabama, United States
 WBYB (FM), a radio station (98.3 FM) licensed to Cleveland, Mississippi, United States, which held the call sign WDFX from 1992 to 2017